The Glinka State Prize of the RSFSR (Государственная премия РСФСР имени М.И. Глинки) was a prize awarded to musicians of the Russian Soviet Federative Socialist Republic from 1965–1991.

To be distinguished from the Glinka Award (of 500 rubles) won in 1900 by Scriabin (for his First Symphony), in 1904 by Rachmaninov, and three times by Reinhold Glière.

Both the prize and the award are named in honour of Russian composer Mikhail Glinka.

Partial list of recipients
 1965 Valery Gavrilin (composer)
 1966 Lev Oborin (pianist)
 1968 Borodin Quartet (string quartet): inc. Dmitri Shebalin (viola)
 1974 Dmitri Shostakovich
 1979 Tikhon Khrennikov (composer)
 1979 Vladislav Sokolov (choral conductor)
 1981 Alexander Voroshilo (baritone)
 1981 Viktor Tretiakov (violin)
 1987 Shostakovich Quartet inc. Aleksandr Galkovsky (viola), Alexander Korchagin (cello)
 1991 Dmitri Hvorostovsky (baritone), Ekaterina Maximova and Vladimir Vasiliev (ballet dancers)

References

External links
 Glinka singing competition (конкурс певцов имени М.И. Глинки) - as won by Dmitri Hvorostovsky in 1987

Russian music awards
Glinka State Prize of the RSFSR winners
Civil awards and decorations of the Soviet Union
Soviet music
Russian Soviet Federative Socialist Republic
Mikhail Glinka